The Eddie Graham Memorial Battle of the Belts was an annual professional wrestling memorial show produced by the Full Impact Pro (FIP) promotion, typically held between February or March. The event was held in memory of Eddie Graham, longtime promoter of the Florida wrestling territory, the first held for Graham since the original Eddie Graham Memorial Shows in 1987-88. The event's title, in particular, was used as a homage to the popular "Battle of the Belts" supercards promoted by Graham during the 1980s. Mike Graham, Eddie's son and organizer of the original "Eddie Graham Memorial Show", opened for the show to speak about his father's legacy and introduced the FIP Florida Heritage Championship.

This version, unlike the previous memorial supercard, was held as a one-night 8-man single-elimination tournament. The first edition was held on March 10, 2007, at the National Guard Armory in Crystal River, Florida and which saw the winner, Erick Stevens being crowned the first-ever FIP Florida Heritage Champion. Dave Prazak and Lenny Leonard were commentators for the first show while Leonard was involved in booking for the second and final "Battle of the Belts". The inaugural show received generally positive reviews. Brad Garoon of 411mania.com rated the event an 8.5, calling it "Stevens' coming out party", and earned the website's "Elite Award".

Tournament winners

Show results

Eddie Graham Memorial Battle of the Belts (2007)
March 10, 2007 in Crystal River, Florida (National Guard Armory)

Tournament brackets
This was a one-night tournament which took place on March 10, 2007. The tournament brackets were:

Eddie Graham Memorial Battle of the Belts (2009)
February 8, 2009 in Brooksville, Florida (National Guard Armory)

Tournament brackets
This was a one-night tournament which took place on February 8, 2009. The tournament brackets were:

References

External links
Promotional video for FIP First Annual Eddie Graham Memorial Battle of the Belts at YouTube
FIP Eddie Graham Memorial Battle of the Belts '07 from The Internet Wrestling Database
FIP Eddie Graham Memorial Battle of the Belts '09 from The Internet Wrestling Database

Professional wrestling memorial shows
Professional wrestling tournaments
Professional wrestling shows in Florida
2007 in professional wrestling
2009 in professional wrestling